Columbia High School is a public high school located in Columbia Station, Ohio, southwest of Cleveland, Ohio.

The school colors are kelly green and white.  The sports teams are known as the Raiders.  The school is a member of the Lorain County League.

Notes and references

External links
 Columbia Local Schools

High schools in Lorain County, Ohio
Public high schools in Ohio